Bo Fanfang (born 10 February 1978) is a Chinese sprinter. She competed in the women's 400 metres at the 2004 Summer Olympics.

References

External links
 

1978 births
Living people
Athletes (track and field) at the 2004 Summer Olympics
Chinese female sprinters
Olympic athletes of China
Asian Games medalists in athletics (track and field)
Asian Games bronze medalists for China
Athletes (track and field) at the 2002 Asian Games
Medalists at the 2002 Asian Games
Runners from Shandong
People from Linyi
Olympic female sprinters